Greenwood High School is located in the city of Greenwood, South Carolina. The school has approximately 1,600 students and is one of two high schools in Greenwood School District 50. The principal is Kathryn Benjamin. The school's mascot is the Eagle.

Campus
In the summer of 2008, Greenwood High began renovations to the campus. A new classroom wing was added, which has been completed and is now known as the "H-Building", and the library was extended. The school has a new office section and has added in a new press box and fixed up the home bleachers.

In the summer of 2020 the Greenwood Performing Arts Auditorium was completed on Greenwood High School’s campus.

Sports
Greenwood High School competes in SCHSL Class AAAA Region I with teams in baseball, basketball, cross country, football, golf, soccer, softball, swimming, tennis, track, volleyball, and wrestling.

Notable alumni
Robert Brooks – former National Football League (NFL) wide receiver
Tomiko Brown-Nagin – Legal historian and professor at Harvard Law School and Harvard University
Ben Coates – former All-Pro tight end for the New England Patriots
Ernest Dye – former NFL offensive lineman
Armanti Edwards – former quarterback for the Appalachian State Mountaineers and former wide receiver for the Carolina Panthers. Led the Mountaineers to two NCAA Division I Football Championships in 2006 and 2007.
Ben Martin – Golfer on the PGA Tour
Will McCants – Author, Noted scholar for Brooking Institute
Sam Montgomery – former NFL defensive end
Josh Norman – Cornerback and Pro Bowler for the Washington Redskins
Marrio Norman – Arena Football League defensive back
Kelcy Quarles – former NFL defensive tackle
D. J. Swearinger – Safety for the Washington Redskins
John Terry – former Canadian Football League All-Star offensive tackle
Harvey White – former American Football League quarterback

References

Schools in Greenwood County, South Carolina
Public high schools in South Carolina
Buildings and structures in Greenwood, South Carolina